The Bust of Carlo Antonio del Pozzo is a sculptural portrait by the Italian artist Gianlorenzo Bernini. It is in the National Gallery of Scotland, Edinburgh. Carlo Antonio was the Archbishop of Pisa and the uncle of the noted seventeenth-century collector, Cassiano del Pozzo, who commissioned Bernini to create the sculpture.

It was acquired by the National Gallery of Scotland in 1986, at a cost of 3m British Pounds, although the value at the time was said to be much higher (around 7.5m pounds). It had previously been in the British stately palace of Castle Howard, since 1715.

See also
List of works by Gian Lorenzo Bernini

Notes

References

External links
 National Galleries of Scotland
 

1620s sculptures
Busts in the United Kingdom
Collections of the National Galleries of Scotland
Busts by Gian Lorenzo Bernini